Tillandsia juncea is a species of flowering plant in the genus Tillandsia. This species is native to northern South America (Colombia, Venezuela, Ecuador, Peru, Bolivia, eastern Brazil), Central America, Mexico and the  West Indies (Cuba, Hispaniola, Jamaica, Trinidad).

Cultivars
 Tillandsia 'But'
 Tillandsia 'Cataco'
 Tillandsia 'Little Star'
 Tillandsia 'Sea Urchin'

References

juncea
Flora of South America
Flora of Central America
Flora of the Caribbean
Flora of Mexico
Plants described in 1802
Epiphytes
Flora without expected TNC conservation status